Andrew Goldberg (born June 26, 1968) is an American producer and director and is the founder and owner of Two Cats Productions in New York City.  An Emmy Award winner, Goldberg's credits include producing/directing documentaries and news and long-form programming for PBS, ABC News, MSNBC and many others.  His works include public affairs, history, and current events, with projects focusing on topics such as the Armenian genocide and contemporary anti-Semitism.

Early life
Andrew Goldberg received a BA in History from Northwestern University in 1992 and an MBA in Marketing from the University of Chicago (1994).

Career
A Yiddish World Remembered (2002) focuses on the story of Jewish life in Eastern Europe before the Holocaust, as told by some of the remaining eyewitnesses.  This film was hosted by Oscar-nominated actor Elliott Gould and was commissioned, funded, and distributed by PBS.  It won a New York Emmy Award for Outstanding Historical/Cultural Programming in 2003.

In 2004, Walter Cronkite hosted Goldberg's film Proud to Serve, which explores the life and culture of the US Army through personal stories of veterans. It premiered nationally on American Public Television and was hailed by the Wall Street Journal as an "extraordinary and absorbing" film that's "...not to be missed."

Goldberg's 2006 film, The Armenian Genocide examines the Armenian genocide during World War I. The film, which aired nationally on PBS, features interviews with the leading experts in the field, such authors Samantha Power and Peter Balakian. It is narrated by Julianna Margulies and includes historical narrations by Ed Harris, Natalie Portman, Laura Linney, Jared Leto, and Orlando Bloom, among others. Alessandra Stanley, the chief television critic of The New York Times, described The Armenian Genocide as "powerful" and stated that it "...honors the victims of the Genocide."

Anti-Semitism in the 21st Century: The Resurgence aired on PBS in January 2007. Hosted by Judy Woodruff, the film explores anti-Semitism in the Christian and Muslim worlds, and covers the history of anti-Semitism in Europe to the present. and The Boston Globe. Barry Garron of The Hollywood Reporter said Goldberg "has performed a real service by analyzing the toxic mixture of ignorance and hatred and explaining why it has been so impervious to enlightenment and civilization for so long."

Goldberg's 2009 film, Jerusalem: Center of the World, aired nationally on PBS on April 1, 2009.

The Iranian Americans chronicles the journey of Iranians who moved to the United States shortly after Ayatollah Khomeini's rise to power in the aftermath of the 1979 revolution. It aired on December 18, 2012.

Goldberg has written and produced television commercials and has also worked extensively in live television and on weekly series.

Recognition and awards
The New York Festivals World Medal, International TV Programming, 2000

The NETA Award for Historical Documentary, 2000

Cine Golden Eagle for Outstanding Historical Programming, 2002

St. Joachim and Anne Humanitarian Award, 2003

Cine Golden Eagle, 2004

Filmography
 The Armenian Americans (2000)
 The Armenians, A Story of Survival (2001)
 A Yiddish World Remembered (2002)
 Images of The Armenian Spirit (2003)
 They Came to America (2003)
 Proud to Serve: The Men and Women of the U.S. Army (2004)
 The Armenian Genocide (2006)
 Anti-Semitism in the 21st Century: The Resurgence (2007)
 The Jewish People: A Story of Survival (2008)
 Jerusalem: Center of the World (2009)
 Out in America (2011)
 The Iranian Americans (2012)

References

External links
 Two Cats Productions Official Website
 
 Andrew Goldberg at amazon.com

1968 births
Living people
American documentary film directors
American alternative journalists
American political writers
American male non-fiction writers
Writers on antisemitism
Place of birth missing (living people)
University of Chicago Booth School of Business alumni
News & Documentary Emmy Award winners
American theatre directors
Journalists from New York City
Film directors from New York City